Robert Newman Addison (18 July 1908 – 8 March 1988) was an Australian rules footballer who played one game for the Footscray Football Club in the Victorian Football League (VFL) in 1931.

Family
The son of Robert Addison (1883-1954), and Elizabeth Jane Addison (1890-1976), née Bridges, Robert Newman Addison was born at Newport, Victoria on 18 July 1908.

He married Alice Evelyn Johnson (1918-1999) in 1938.

Football
His solitary game came against Hawthorn in round 1. He did not kick a goal.

After playing for Spotswood in 1932, Addison crossed to Williamstown in the VFA in 1933 and played 27 games and kicked 33 goals.  He was leading goalscorer at Williamstown in 1933 with a total of 23.

He was cleared to the South Bendigo Football Club in the Bendigo Football League in 1934.

Death
He died at Footscray, Victoria on 8 March 1988.

References

External links

Bob Addison's playing statistics from The VFA Project

1908 births
1988 deaths
Australian rules footballers from Melbourne
Western Bulldogs players
Williamstown Football Club players
South Bendigo Football Club players
People from Melbourne